Myanma–Venezuelan relations are the bilateral relations between Myanmar and Venezuela. Both countries currently have diplomatic relations and the ambassador of Venezuela in Vietnam is accredited to Myanmar.

History 
On 29 July 2019, during the Venezuelan presidential crisis, Myanmar's representation to the United Nations joined a joint statement, addressed to Secretary-General António Guterres, in support of the government of Nicolás Maduro.

Diplomatic missions 
Venezuela has a concurrent embassy to Myanmar in Vietnam.

See also 
 Foreign relations of Myanmar
 Foreign relations of Venezuela
 Venezuela–Vietnam relations

References 

Venezuela
Myanmar